The Grand Darray (also spelled Grand Darrey) (3,514 m) is a mountain of the Mont Blanc massif, located north of La Fouly in the canton of Valais. It lies on the range east of the Aiguille de l'A Neuve, between the Saleina Glacier and the main Ferret valley.

References

External links
 Grand Darray on Hikr

Mountains of the Alps
Alpine three-thousanders
Mountains of Valais
Mountains of Switzerland
Mont Blanc massif